Order of Liberation was a Chinese military award awarded to heroes of the Liberation of mainland China during the Second Chinese Civil War between 3 September 1945 and 30 June 1950. There are three grades: First Class Medal, Second Class Medal, and Third Class Medal.

Pattern

Service Ribbon

Notable recipients 
 Ten Marshals: Zhu De, Peng Dehuai, Lin Biao, Liu Bocheng, He Long, Chen Yi, Luo Ronghuan, Xu Xiangqian, Nie Rongzhen, Ye Jianying.
 Ten Senior Generals: Su Yu, Xu Haidong, Huang Kecheng, Chen Geng, Tan Zheng, Xiao Jinguang, Zhang Yunyi, Luo Ruiqing, Wang Shusheng, Xu Guangda.
 General officer: Tao Zhiyue, Huang Yongsheng, Dong Qiwu, etc.
 Lieutenant general: Ding Qiusheng, Wang Jinshan, Wang Enmao, etc.
 Major general: Ye Changgen, Li Zhen, Liu Ziqi, Sun Chaoqun, Yang Yongsong, etc.

References 

Military awards and decorations of the People's Liberation Army
Awards established in 1955
1955 establishments in China